Jesse Winker (born August 17, 1993) is an American professional baseball outfielder for the Milwaukee Brewers of Major League Baseball (MLB). He has previously played in MLB for the Cincinnati Reds and Seattle Mariners. He was an All-Star in 2021.

Amateur career
Winker was born in Buffalo, New York and lived nearby in Niagara Falls, New York, before moving to Orlando, Florida at the age of seven. Winker was drafted by the Cincinnati Reds in the first round (49th overall) of the 2012 Major League Baseball draft out of Olympia High School in Orlando, Florida. As a junior at Olympia, he had a .509 batting average. He had committed to play college baseball at the University of Florida for the Florida Gators, but chose to sign with the Reds rather than attend college.

Professional career

Cincinnati Reds
Winker made his professional debut for the Billings Mustangs in 2012. In 62 games, he hit .338/.443/.500 with five home runs in 228 at-bats. Prior to the 2013 season, Winker was ranked by Baseball America as the Reds sixth best prospect. He played the 2013 season with the Dayton Dragons where he became a Midwest League All-Star and Home Run Derby champion. He hit .281/.379/.463 with 16 home runs in 417 at bats over 112 games.

Before the 2014 season, he was ranked by Baseball America as the Reds fourth best prospect. He started the season with the Bakersfield Blaze. In June he was promoted to the Double-A Pensacola Blue Wahoos. In July, Winker played in the All-Star Futures Game, going 1-2. His season came to an end in July after suffering a partially torn tendon in his right wrist in a car accident. In 74 games, he hit .287/.399/.518 with 15 home runs and 57 runs batted in (RBI). Winker returned after the season to play in the Arizona Fall League. Winker spent 2015 with Pensacola, where he posted a .282 batting average with 13 home runs and 55 RBIs.

The Reds added Winker to their 40-man roster after the 2016 season. He began the 2017 season with the Louisville Bats of the Class AAA International League, and was promoted to the major leagues on April 14. In 2017, Winker batted .298 with seven home runs in 47 games played. Winker began 2018 with Cincinnati, and was a starting outfielder before a right shoulder injury in July ended his season. Prior to his injury, he slashed .299/.405/.431 with seven home runs and 43 RBIs.

In 2019 for Cincinnati, Winker played in 113 games with a batting line of .269/.357/.473 to go along with a career-high 16 home runs as well as 38 RBI. In 2020, Winker played in 54 games for the Reds, slashing .255/.388/.544 with 12 home runs and 23 RBI. He was nominated by MLB.com to play as the DH for the National League Unofficial 2020 All-Star team.

On June 6, 2021, Winker hit three home runs in a narrow 8-7 victory against the St. Louis Cardinals, helping the Reds complete a four-game sweep with his second three-homer game of the year. He also became the first player in Reds history to log multiple 3-homer games in a season. That season, he was named the NL starting right fielder for the All-Star Game.

Seattle Mariners
On March 14, 2022, the Reds traded Winker and Eugenio Suárez to the Seattle Mariners in exchange for Justin Dunn, Jake Fraley, Brandon Williamson, and a player to be named later, which turned out to be Connor Phillips. The transaction was a cost-cutting measure that saved the franchise just under $36 million but was unpopular with Reds fans.

On April 24, Winker hit a walk-off single in the bottom of the 12th inning for his first walk-off as a member of the Mariners. Winker and the Mariners agreed to a two-year contract on June 16. 

During a June 26 game against the Los Angeles Angels at Angel Stadium, Winker was hit in the thigh by an alleged beanball from Angels pitcher Andrew Wantz. Winker proceeded to charge the Angels dugout and a bench-clearing brawl ensued. Winker first confronted injured Angels third baseman Anthony Rendon, and Rendon proceeded to strike Winker in the face with his left hand while wearing a cast on his right, then Winker later got into an altercation with Ryan Tepera. Winker was later seen arguing with Angels interim manager Phil Nevin shortly before another skirmish broke out near them. Winker, along with several other players from both the Mariners and Angels, was ejected from the game. Upon leaving the field, Winker flipped off the Angel Stadium crowd sitting behind the visitors' dugout, a gesture for which he later apologized.

In 2022, Winker batted .219 with 14 home runs and 53 RBIs. After the season, he had surgery on his knee and his neck.

Milwaukee Brewers
On December 2, 2022, the Mariners traded Winker and Abraham Toro to the Milwaukee Brewers for Kolten Wong.

Personal life
Winker has a daughter who was born in 2020.

References

External links

1993 births
Living people
People from Windermere, Florida
Baseball players from Florida
Major League Baseball outfielders
Cincinnati Reds players
Seattle Mariners players
Billings Mustangs players
Dayton Dragons players
Bakersfield Blaze players
Pensacola Blue Wahoos players
Surprise Saguaros players
Louisville Bats players